Alfio is an Italian given name. Notable people with the name include:

 Alfio Basile, Argentina football coach
 Alfio Bonanno, Australian tenor
 Alfio Caltabiano, Italian actor
 Alfio Contini, Italian cinematographer
 Alfio Fazio, Italian composer
 Alfio Fontana, Italian footballer
 Alfio Giuffrida, Italian sculptor
 Alfio Marchini, Italian entrepreneur
 Alfio Molina, Swiss ice hockey player
 Alfio Musmarra, Italian journalist
 Alfio Oviedo, Paraguayan footballer
 Alfio Peraboni, Italian sailor
 Alfio Piva, Costa Rican politician
 Alfio Quarteroni, Italian mathmetician
 Alfio Vandi, Italian racing cyclist

Italian masculine given names